Kalevi-Liiva are sand dunes in Jõelähtme Parish in Harju County, Estonia. The site is located near the Baltic coast, north of the Jägala village and the former Jägala concentration camp. It is best known as the execution site of at least 6,000 Jewish and Roma Holocaust victims.

Execution site 

The Kalevi-Liiva site served as the execution and burial site for trainloads of Central European Jews transported to Estonia for extermination. Other victims include Gypsies and political prisoners of mainly Estonian and Russian origin.

The mass execution were carried out by Estonian Nazi collaborators under German supervision. At least two trainloads of Jews arrived at the Raasiku railway station, one from Theresienstadt on September 5, 1942, and another from Germany in mid-September. The trains carried over 2,000 people, mainly German and Czechoslovakian Jews, about 450 of whom were selected for forced labor and interned at the Jägala concentration camp, the rest were transferred by bus to Kalevi-Liiva and immediately executed.

The Estonians in charge of the executions, Aleksander Laak, Ain-Ervin Mere and Ralf Gerrets, were implicated in the Holocaust trials in Soviet Estonia in 1961 and charged with murdering up to 5,000 German and Czechoslovakian Jews and Gypsies in 1942–1943.

Estimates of the total number of victims vary. The two memorial stones on the site cite 6,000 Jews and 2,000 Roma. Contemporary sources estimate at least 1,700 (probably 1,754) Jews killed at Kalevi-Liiva, other known victims include forty Gypsies and a number of "political prisoners" of mainly Estonian and Russian origin.

See also
Ain-Ervin Mere
Collaboration during World War II
Holocaust trials in Soviet Estonia
History of the Jews in Estonia
Judenfrei
Occupation of Estonia by Nazi Germany

References

External links
Crimes against Humanity and War Crimes in Estonia
Der Holocaust und die Konzentrationslager in Estland
Zeugenaussagen über die Massenerschießungen
Kalevi-Liiva
Kalevi-Liiva
Milline fashismiohvrite mälestusmärk?
Kalevi_Liiva, 1992
Kalevi-Liiva, 2005
Kalevi-Liiva, 2005

The Holocaust in Estonia
Jõelähtme Parish
Tourist attractions in Harju County
Holocaust locations in Estonia